The 1979 Tulane Green Wave football team represented Tulane University in the 1979 NCAA Division I-A football season. The team was led by Larry Smith.  The Green Wave played home games in the Louisiana Superdome.  The team finished with a record of 9–3 and played in the 1979 Liberty Bowl, losing 6–9 to Penn State.

The offense scored 318 points while the defense allowed 179 points. Two members of the Green Wave team were drafted into the National Football League.

The Wave opened the season by smashing Stanford 33-10, spoiling John Elway's collegiate debut.

In the 77th edition of the Battle for the Rag, Tulane beat LSU 24–13 in what was LSU coach Charles McClendon's final regular season game after 18 seasons.

Schedule

Roster

Team players in the NFL

References

Tulane
Tulane Green Wave football seasons
Tulane Green Wave football